Lindsay Arnold Cusick (born January 11, 1994) is an American professional Latin and ballroom dancer. She was a contestant on So You Think You Can Dance. She is a professional dancer and choreographer on Dancing with the Stars.

Personal life
Lindsay Arnold was born and raised in Provo, Utah, and is the oldest of four daughters. Her siblings are Jensen, Brynley, and Rylee. On June 18, 2015, she married her high-school sweetheart, Samuel Cusick, in a Church of Jesus Christ of Latter-day Saints ceremony at the Salt Lake Temple in Salt Lake City, Utah. Fellow Dancing with the Stars dancers Brittany Cherry, Jenna Johnson, and Emma Slater were among her bridesmaids, with Witney Carson serving as maid of honor. On May 13, 2020, she announced she and Cusick were expecting their first child, a girl, due in November. Their daughter was born on November 2, 2020. On October 24, 2022, she announced she and Cusick were expecting their second child, a girl, due in May 2023.

So You Think You Can Dance
At age 18, Arnold auditioned for the ninth season of So You Think You Can Dance. She progress to the top 20 finalists. Her partner was martial arts fusion dancer Cole Horibe. With 10 dancers remained,  the contestants switched partners to a new one each week. As she proceeded to the top eight dancers, Arnold partnered with Jakob Karr and Alex Wong. She was eliminated on August 29, 2012. After the season, she performed on the show's 30-city tour.

Dancing with the Stars

Arnold became a professional dancer on season 16 of the reality television series Dancing with the Stars. At the time, she was the second-youngest pro dancer in the show's history, following Julianne Hough joining the show at 18. She was partnered with professional boxer Victor Ortiz. They finished in 8th place and were eliminated in week six after getting three 6s.

She returned in season 17 as a member of the dance troupe, and continued in the troupe through season 20.

She was promoted again to a professional partner in season 21, in which she partnered with National Guard member Alek Skarlatos. The couple made it to the finals and finished in third place.

Arnold returned as a professional for season 22 and was paired with Boyz II Men singer Wanya Morris. They were eliminated in the semifinals, finishing in 4th place.

In season 23, she was partnered with former NFL player Calvin Johnson Jr., finishing in third place.

The following season, her partner was former Major League Baseball catcher David Ross. They finished in second place, behind Rashad Jennings and Emma Slater.

In season 25, Arnold was paired with singer-actor Jordan Fisher. They won the season on November 21, 2017, setting the record for most perfect scores with a total of 9.

The next season, Arnold and former NBA player Kareem Abdul-Jabbar were eliminated in the second week of competition, tying for 7th place with Arike Ogunbowale and Gleb Savchenko.

In season 27, she was paired with former NFL player DeMarcus Ware. The couple was eliminated on week 7 of the competition, finishing in 7th place.

The following season, Arnold was paired with former White House Press Secretary and political aide Sean Spicer. Despite consistently earning low scores and criticism from the judges, home-audience votes kept the pair in through week 9, and they finished in 6th place.

Arnold returned to the show in season 30. She was partnered with season 25 Bachelor Matt James.

Performances
Season 16 with celebrity partner Victor Ortiz

Season 21 with celebrity partner Alek Skarlatos

1 Score given by guest judge Alfonso Ribeiro.

2 This week only, for "Partner Switch-Up" week, Skarlatos performed with Emma Slater instead of Arnold. Arnold performed with Carlos PenaVega.

3 Score given by guest judge Maksim Chmerkovskiy.

4 Score given by guest judge Olivia Newton-John.

Season 22 with celebrity partner Wanya Morris

1 Score given by guest judge Zendaya.2 For this week only, as part of "America's Switch Up", Morris performed with Witney Carson instead of Arnold. Arnold performed with Von Miller.3 Score given by guest judge Maksim Chmerkovskiy.3 Due to Goodman being the judge coaching Morris' team during the team-up dance, the viewers scored the dance in his place with the averaged score being counted alongside the remaining judges.

Season 23 with celebrity partner Calvin Johnson Jr.

1 Score given by guest judge Pitbull.2 Score given by guest judge Idina Menzel

Season 24 with celebrity partner David Ross

1 Score given by guest judge Nick Carter2 Score given by guest judge Mandy Moore

Season 25 with celebrity partner Jordan Fisher

1 Score given by guest judge Shania Twain.2 Score given by guest judge Julianne Hough.

Season 26 with celebrity partner Kareem Abdul-Jabbar

1 Score given by guest judge Rashad Jennings.

Season 27 with celebrity partner DeMarcus Ware

Season 28 with celebrity partner Sean Spicer

1 Score given by guest judge Leah Remini.  2 Due to Arnold being unable to perform weeks 8 and 9, Spicer danced with Jenna Johnson instead.  3 Score given by guest judge Joey Fatone.

Season 30 with celebrity partner Matt James

References

External links

1994 births
Living people
Artists from Provo, Utah
American female dancers
American ballroom dancers
American women choreographers
American choreographers
Latter Day Saints from Utah
So You Think You Can Dance (American TV series) contestants
21st-century American dancers
Dancing with the Stars (American TV series) winners
21st-century American women